831 Stateira is an asteroid belonging to the Baptistina family in the Main Belt named after Stateira, wife of Artaxerexes II.

References

External links
 
 

000831
Discoveries by Max Wolf
Named minor planets
19160920